Silverthorne is a surname. Notable people with the surname include:

Alexandra Silverthorne (born 1980), American photographer
Dennis Silverthorne (1923-2004), British pair skater
Jeanne Silverthorne (born 1950), American artist
Jeffrey Silverthorne (born 1946), American photographer
Judith Silverthorne (born 1953), Canadian author
Paul Silverthorne (born 1951), British violist
Thora Silverthorne (1910-1990), British Communist activist
Winifred Silverthorne (1925–1998), British pair skater